Collective punishment is a punishment or sanction imposed on a group for acts allegedly perpetrated by a member of that group, which could be an ethnic or political group, or just the family, friends and neighbors of the perpetrator. Because individuals who are not responsible for the wrong acts are targeted, collective punishment is not compatible with the basic principle of individual responsibility. The punished group may often have no direct association with the perpetrator other than living in the same area and can not be assumed to exercise control over the perpetrator's actions. Collective punishment is prohibited by treaty in both international and non-international armed conflicts, more specifically Common Article 3 of the Geneva Conventions and Additional Protocol II.

When collective punishment has been imposed it has resulted in atrocities. Historically, occupying powers have used collective punishment against resistance movements. In some cases entire towns and villages believed to have harboured or aided such resistance movements have been destroyed. Occupying powers have claimed that collective punishment can be justified by necessity as a deterrent. Another view is that it is a retaliatory act prohibited under the laws of war.

Sources of law

Hague Conventions

The Hague Conventions are often cited for guidelines concerning the limits and privileges of an occupiers rights with respect to the local (occupied) property. One of the restrictions on the occupier's use of natural resources is the Article 50 prohibition against collective punishment protecting private property. An exception exists allowing takings for military uses with the requirement that the property "must be restored and compensation fixed when peace is made".

Geneva Conventions

According to Médecins Sans Frontières:

International law posits that no person may be punished for acts that he or she did not commit. It ensures that the collective punishment of a group of persons for a crime committed by an individual is forbidden...This is one of the fundamental guarantees established by the Geneva Conventions and their protocols. This guarantee is applicable not only to protected persons but to all individuals, no matter what their status, or to what category of persons they belong..."

Issues

Collective responsibility

Modern legal systems usually limit criminal liability to individuals. An example of this is the prohibition on "Corruption of Blood" in the Treason Clause of the United States Constitution. The ius commune of late medieval Florence already held individual responsibility as a bright line rule. With few exceptions (such as treason) an individual could not be punished for a criminal offense they did not know about, even if it was committed by a member of their family. To preserve the Lombard law's historic mitigating impact on blood feuds an exception was made recognizing a collective responsibility for vendettas, in which case father, son and kinsmen were all held responsible.

Rather than attempt to discover some "contra-causal free will", modern philosophers will usually use notions of intention to establish individual moral responsibility. This Kantian approach may not be the only way to assess responsibility, especially considering groups may need a unique approach to individuals. For instance, there is the problem is that consistent (not hypocritical) individuals may nevertheless experience a discursive dilemma when they try to act as a group.

Philosopher Kenneth Shockley suggests we focus on group faults and the punishments that would bring change. Punishments, for a group, might include: full or partial disbanding, weakening bonds between members, or de-institutionalizing some of the group's norms. Neta Crawford says groups can be expected to change, but also apologize and make amends. That might mean groups must forfeit important parts of themselves. In this case, groups are being held responsible for organizing or incentivizing harmful behaviors. Shockley calls this the group's "coordinating control" over members. He says group responsibility can mitigate individual responsibility.

Deterrence

Collective liability may be effective as a deterrent, if it creates the incentive for the group to monitor the activities of other members. This type of "indirect deterrence" or "delegated deterrence" has historically targeted boards of officials or those in a position to monitor and control others.

A deterrent theory of collective punishment may be more attractive in the context of military occupation where punishing the innocent is not considered costly.

Types

Family punishment

Family punishment is a type of collective punishment based on kinship. Historically, it has been employed most often in the context of political crimes.

Collective punishment as family sanction in Ancient Greece was connected with the concept of a ritual pollution that contaminated the entire group when one member committed an offense. An example of this type was the punishment imposed on the Alcmaeonidae for taking part in the Cylonian conspiracy.

During the Qin dynasty of China (221–207 BC), emperor Qin Shi Huang upheld his rule by enforcing strict laws, with the most serious of crimes, such as treason, punishable by what is known as nine familial exterminations – this involved the execution of the perpetrator's entire families as well as the perpetrators themselves, where the members are categorized into nine groups. The process of familial extermination was carried on by subsequent Chinese dynasties for serious crimes, with a significant number of recorded sentences during the Ming dynasty (1368–1644), until the punishment was officially repealed by the government of the Qing dynasty (1644–1912) in 1905. During the Ming dynasty of China, 16 palace women attempted to assassinate the Jiajing Emperor. All were sentenced to death by slow slicing. Ten members of the women's families were also beheaded, while a further 20 were enslaved and gifted to ministers.

It was called Sippenhaft in Nazi Germany, and was applied to the families of racially acceptable individuals who were accused of acting against the state, whether by desertion, cowardice, treason or more minor incidents of disobedience.

Related to family punishment is the concept of corruption of blood, where the collective punishment of families may reflect primitive values that emphasize the importance of "inherited" bad character and the "purity" of hereditary bloodlines.

Sanctions

Collective fines
A collective fine like the weregild may create incentives for a group to identify perpetrators where they might not do so otherwise. Richard Posner and others consider collective fines to be the most effective type of collective punishment for deterring bad behavior when they are sufficiently costly and target those in a position to identify perpetrators.

When collective fines are imposed on select groups of elites it can create an incentive for them to identify perpetrators but the effectiveness declines with an increase in the size of the group and their relative wealth.

The frankpledge system of enforcement was by the 12th century established throughout much of the English realm. Cnut had organized the conquered peoples of England into "hundreds" and tithings, "within a hundred and under surety". Scholars do not know if the surety of Cnut's time was a collective or individual liability, or whether collective punishment was a feature of Anglo-Saxon law, before the Norman Conquest and the 12th century frankpledge system applied collective punishment to the whole tithing. The 13th century Statute of Winchester (1285) stipulated "the whole hundred ... shall be answerable" for any theft or robbery.

Destruction of houses

According to W. R. Connor "the importance of the oikos in ancient Greece, an importance that goes far beyond the needs for physical shelter and comfort, is well known". The destruction of homes is then "especially awesome and charged with symbolic as well as practical meaning."

The practice of the kataskaphai of houses is attested to by several ancient Greek sources. According to Plutarch's account of the murder of Hesiod (found in the Moralia) the house of the murderers was razed . When the Corinthians kill Cypselus they "razed the houses of the tyrants and confiscated their property", according to Nicholas of Damascus. Sources are inconsistent as to the razing of the Alcamaeonid houses. Of the many sources on the Cylonian conspiracy, only Isocrates mentions kataskaphe.

There have been a large number of home demolitions in Israel since 1967. The legal arguments center on Regulation 119(1) of the Defense Emergency Regulations, an emergency law that dates to the British occupation under the Mandate for Palestine, by which Israel claims the legal authority for home demolitions by the Israeli Defense Force (IDF). In Alamarin v. IDF Commander in Gaza Strip the Israeli High Court of Justice held that the homes of Palestinians who have committed violent acts may be demolished under the Defence (Emergency) Regulations, even if the residence has other inhabitants who are unconnected to the crime. The counterargument against the validity of the regulation is two-fold: firstly, that it should have been properly revoked by 1967 as an institution of the former colonial rule; secondly, that it is incompatible with Israel's modern treaty obligations.

Rape

Some scholars consider the rape of German women by the Red Army during the Russian advance into Germany in 1945 towards the end of World War II as a form of collective punishment. Women were also targeted as a collective punishment for collaboration in Vichy France where photographs were taken of women stripped and paraded through the streets of Paris. A prostitute accused of serving the Germans was kicked to death.

Responding to the 2014 murder of three Israeli teenagers kidnapped near the settlement of Alon Shvut, Israeli professor Mordechai Kedar said:
The only thing that can deter terrorists, like those who kidnapped the children and killed them, is the knowledge that their sister or their mother will be raped. It sounds very bad, but that's the Middle East.

Women are frequently targeted in the Kashmir conflict "to punish and humiliate the entire community". Even in well publicized cases like the Kunan Poshpora mass rape no action has been taken against perpetrators.

History

18th century
The Intolerable Acts were seen as a collective punishment of Massachusetts for the Boston Tea Party.

19th century
The principle of collective punishment was laid out by Union General William Tecumseh Sherman in his Special Field Order 120, November 9, 1864, which laid out the rules for his "March to the sea" in the American Civil War:

V. To army corps commanders alone is entrusted the power to destroy mills, houses, cotton-gins, etc..., and for them this general principle is laid down: In districts and neighborhoods where the army is unmolested, no destruction of such property should be permitted; but should guerrillas or bushwhackers molest our march, or should the inhabitants burn bridges, obstruct roads, or otherwise manifest local hostility, then army commanders should order and enforce a devastation more or less relentless according to the measure of such hostility.

The British (in the Second Boer War) and the Germans (in the Franco-Prussian War) justified such actions as being in accord with the laws of war then in force.

20th century

World War I 
The mass shootings of Nicholas Romanov's distant relatives after his abdication in 1917 and the shooting of the Romanov family themselves in July of the following year, 1918, were two such examples of this during World War I.

World War II

By Germany 

During the Nazi occupation of Poland, the Germans applied collective responsibility: any kind of help given to a person of Jewish faith or origin was punishable by death, and that not only for the rescuers themselves but also for their families. This was widely publicized by the Germans. During the occupation, for every German killed by a Pole, 100–400 Poles were shot in retribution. Communities were held collectively responsible for the purported Polish counter-attacks against the invading German troops. Mass executions of roundup (pol: łapanka) hostages were conducted every single day during the Wehrmacht advance across Poland in September 1939 and thereafter. Poland lost over 5 million citizens during the occupation by Nazi Germany, mostly civilians.

Germany also applied collective punishment elsewhere. In the summer of 1941, Wehrmacht troops executed several hundred people in Kondomari, Alikianos, Kandanos and elsewhere in retaliation for the participation of Cretan civilians in the Battle of Crete. During its occupation by the Axis from 1941 to 1944, Greece suffered a remarkably high death toll due to reprisals against the support and involvement of the population in the Resistance. Large-scale massacres were carried out in places such as Domeniko, Kommeno, Viannos, Lyngiades, Kali Sykia, Drakeia, Kalavryta, Mesovouno, Damasta, Distomo, Kedros, Chortiatis and many others. Entire villages (e.g. Anogeia, Vorizia, Magarikari, Kamares, Lochria), were also pillaged and burnt.

In Yugoslavia (now Serbia), Nazi troops killed 434 men in three villages near Kragujevac on October 19, 1941, as punishment for previous actions of the Serbian resistance movement. In the next two days, the Nazis also killed more than 13,000 people in Kraljevo, Kragujevac, and Sumarice, including 300 students from Kragujevac First High School. In 1942, the Germans destroyed the village of Lidice, Czechoslovakia (now the Czech Republic) killing 340 inhabitants as collective punishment or reprisal for that year's assassination of Reinhard Heydrich by nearby commandos (the village Ležáky was also destroyed in retribution). In the French village of Oradour-sur-Glane 642 of its inhabitants – men, women, and children – were slaughtered by the German Waffen-SS in 1944, as were 335 Italians in that same year's Ardeatine massacre in caves outside Rome. In the Dutch village of Putten and the Italian villages of Sant'Anna di Stazzema and Marzabotto, as well as in the Soviet village of Kortelisy (in what is now Ukraine), large-scale reprisal killings were carried out by the Germans. The Massacre of Borovë occurred on July 9, 1943, in the village of Borovë, in southeastern Albania. German forces killed 107 civilians as a reprisal for a partisan attack on a German convoy the days before. In Lithuania, on June 3, 1944, after attack of Soviet partisans on a group of Germans in a nearby forest, a punishment squadron burned alive 119 people (including 49 children under the age of 16) – almost all inhabitants of the village of Pirčiupiai.

Against Germany 
The expulsion of German speaking population groups after World War II by the Soviet Union, Poland and Czechoslovakia represent one of the greatest examples of collective punishment in terms of the number of victims. The goal was to punish the Germans; the Allies declared them collectively guilty of Nazi war crimes. In the US and UK the ideas of German collective guilt and collective punishment originated not with the American and British people, but on higher policy levels. Not until late in the war did the US public assign collective responsibility to the German people.

Soviet Union 
Joseph Stalin's mass deportations of many nationalities of the USSR to remote regions (including the Chechens, Crimean Tatars, Volga Germans and many others) exemplifies officially orchestrated collective punishment.

Stalin used the partial removal of potentially trouble-making ethnic groups as a technique consistently during his career: Poles (1939–1941 and 1944–45), Romanians (1941 and 1944–1953), Estonians, Latvians, Lithuanians (1941 and 1945–1949), Volga Germans (1941), Chechens, and Ingushes (1944). Shortly before, during and immediately after World War II, Stalin conducted a series of deportations on a huge scale which profoundly affected the ethnic map of the Soviet Union. Between 1941 and 1949 the Soviet authorities deported an estimated nearly 3.3 million people to Siberia and to the Central Asian republics.

The deportations started with Poles from Belarus, Ukraine and European Russia (see Poles in the former Soviet Union) in the period 1932–1936. Koreans in the Russian Far East were deported in 1937 (see Deportation of Koreans in the Soviet Union). After the Soviet invasion of Poland (17 September 1939) following the corresponding German invasion (1 September 1939) that marked the start of World War II in Europe, the Soviet Union annexed eastern parts (the so-called Kresy) of the Second Polish Republic. During 1939–1941 the Soviet regime deported 1.45 million people inhabitants of this area, of whom 63% were Poles and 7% were Jews. Similar events followed in the Baltic states of Estonia, Latvia, and Lithuania following their incorporation into the Soviet union in 1940. More than 200,000 people are estimated to have been deported from the Baltic in 1940–1953. 10% of the entire adult Baltic population was deported or sent to labor camps. (See June deportation, Operation Priboi, Soviet deportations from Estonia.) Volga Germans and seven (overwhelmingly Turkic or non-Slavic) nationalities of the Crimea and the northern Caucasus were deported: the Crimean Tatars, Kalmyks, Chechens, Ingush, Balkars, Karachays, and Meskhetian Turks. All Crimean Tatars were deported en masse in a form of collective punishment.

One can regard pogroms as examples of unofficial collective punishment which resemble rioting.

About 14 million Germans were moved out of territories formerly part of the East of Germany; up to three million of them died.

India 
The 1984 anti-Sikh riots (alternatively called the 1984 Sikh Massacre), a riot directed against Sikhs in India by anti-Sikh mobs, responded to the assassination of Indira Gandhi by her Sikh bodyguards. The episode resulted in more than 3000 deaths. India's Central Bureau of Investigation (CBI) expressed the opinion that the acts of violence were well-organized, with support from the officials in the Delhi police and in the central government at the time, then headed by Indira Gandhi's son, Rajiv Gandhi. When asked about the riots, Rajiv, a Congress party member who was sworn in as the Prime Minister after his mother's death, said "When a big tree falls, the earth shakes".

Cold War

United Kingdom
In several armed conflicts the United Kingdom engaged during the 1950s, collective punishment was utilized as a tactic to suppress various insurgencies such as the Malayan Emergency, the Mau Mau Uprising, and the Cyprus Emergency. In 1951, the British government announced plans which stipulated that non-combatants found supporting the Malayan National Liberation Army would be subject to 'collective punishment'. During the Mau Mau Uprising, the colonial administration also utilised collective punishment as a tactic against the Kenya Land and Freedom Army, while in Cyprus (during the Cyprus Emergency) the British authorities adopted a tactic of home evictions and business closures in regions where British personnel had been murdered in order to obtain information about the identities of the murderers.

Azerbaijan
Black January was a massacre of civilians committed by the Red Army in the Azerbaijan Soviet Socialist Republic in 1990. The Human Rights Watch report entitled "Black January in Azerbaijan" states: "Indeed, the violence used by the Soviet Army on the night of January 19–20 was so out of proportion to the resistance offered by Azerbaijanis as to constitute an exercise in collective punishment."

21st century

North Korea
In North Korea, political prisoners are sent to the kwalliso concentration camps along with their relatives without any fair trial. North Korean citizens convicted of more serious political crimes are sentenced to life imprisonment, and the summary two generations of their family (children and grandchildren) will be born in the camps as part of the "3 generations of punishment" policy instigated by state founder Kim Il-Sung in 1948. North Korea's political penal labor colonies, transliterated kwalliso or kwan-li-so, constitute one of three forms of political imprisonment in the country, the other two being what Hawk (2012) translates as "short-term detention/forced-labor centers" and "long-term prison labor camps" for misdemeanor and felony offences respectively. In total, there are an estimated 150,000 to 200,000 political prisoners housed within the North Korean imprisonment system. In contrast to these other systems, the condemned are sent there without any form of judicial process as are their immediate three generations of family members as kin punishment.
North Korea's kwalliso consist of a series of sprawling encampments measuring kilometers long and kilometers wide. The number of these encampments has varied over time. They are located mainly in the valleys between high mountains, mostly in the northern provinces of North Korea. There are between 5,000 and 50,000 prisoners per kwalliso, totaling perhaps some 150,000 to 200,000 prisoners throughout North Korea. The kwalliso are usually surrounded at their outer perimeters by barbed-wire fences punctuated with guard towers and patrolled by heavily armed guards. The encampments include self-contained closed "village" compounds for single persons, usually the alleged wrongdoers, and other closed, fenced-in "villages" for the extended families of the wrongdoers.

Israel
The current blockade of Gaza has been criticized by the International Committee of the Red Cross, in a United Nations report, and by various other organisations as collective punishment aimed at the Palestinians.

Pakistan
On May 20, 2008, the Pakistan Army conducted collective punishment against a village called Spinkai, located in the Federally Administered Tribal Areas of Pakistan. The operation was called 'zalzala', which is Arabic for earthquake. At first, the Pakistan Army swept through with helicopter gunships, artillery and tanks. After four days of heavy fighting, 25 militants and six soldiers died. The rest of the militants retreated up the valley. After the capture of the village the army discovered bomb factories, detonation-ready suicide jackets and schools for teenage suicide bombers.

The Pakistan Army immediately decided to punish the village for harboring the Taliban and allowing the militants to operate in and from the village to conduct further terror attacks in Pakistan. Bulldozers and explosives experts turned Spinkai's bazaar into a mile-long pile of rubble. Petrol stations, shops, and even parts of the hospital were leveled or blown up. The villagers were forbidden from returning to their homes.

South Africa
South Africa still retains the Apartheid-era law of common purpose, by which those who make up part of a group can be punished for the crimes of other group members, even if they were not themselves actively involved. In August 2012 this came to public attention when 270 miners were threatened with prosecution for participating in a demonstration. During the demonstration at the Marikana mine, 34 miners were shot by police. Many of the miners were armed. When prosecutors said they would pursue charges against other miners who were part of the protest, there was a public outcry.

Syria
Throughout most of Syria's ongoing civil war, collective punishment has been a recurring method used by the Syrian government to quell opposition cities and suburbs throughout the country, whereby entire cities are besieged, shelled, and destroyed if that city is deemed as pro-opposition.

Upon retaking the capital Damascus after the 2012 Battle of Damascus, the Syrian government began a campaign of collective punishment against Sunni suburbs in-and-around the capital which had supported Free Syrian Army presence in their neighborhoods.

In opposition-controlled cities and districts in Aleppo Province and Aleppo city, reports indicate that the Syrian government is attacking civilians at bread bakeries with artillery rounds and rockets, with the reports indicating that the bakeries were shelled indiscriminately. Human Rights Watch said these are war crimes, as the only military targets wherever the few rebels manning the bakeries, and that dozens of civilians were killed.

In Idlib province in the northwest of the country, entire cities were shelled and bombed for sheltering opposition activists and rebels, with the victims mostly civilians, along with heavy financial losses.

See also
 Achan
 Achor
 Decimation (Roman army)
 Family members of traitors to the Motherland
 Market share liability
 Terrorism

References

External links 
 

 
Collectivism